King's Highway 11, commonly referred to as Highway 11, is a provincially maintained highway in the Canadian province of Ontario. At , it is the second longest highway in the province, following Highway 17. Highway11 begins at Highway 400 in Barrie, and arches through northern Ontario to the Ontario–Minnesota border at Rainy River via Thunder Bay; the road continues as Minnesota State Highway 72 across the Baudette–Rainy River International Bridge. North and west of North Bay (as well as for a short distance through Orillia), Highway11 forms part of the Trans-Canada Highway. The highway is also part of MOM's Way between Thunder Bay and Rainy River.

The original section of Highway11 along Yonge Street was colloquially known as "Main Street Ontario", and was one of the first roads in what would later become Ontario. It was devised as an overland military route between York (Toronto) and Penetanguishene. Yonge Street serves as the east–west divide throughout York Region and Toronto.

Highway11 became a provincial highway in 1920 when the network was formed, although many of the roads that make up the route were constructed before the highway was designated. At the time, it only extended between Toronto and north of Orillia. In 1937, the route was extended to Hearst, northwest of Timmins. The route was extended to Nipigon by 1943. The southernmost leg, an  section (including the Bradford–Barrie extension) through Barrie and south to Lake Ontario in Toronto, also known as Yonge Street, was decommissioned as a provincial highway in 1996 and 1997.

From the late 1940s through the 1960s, numerous bypasses of towns along the route were built, including Orillia, Washago, Gravenhurst, Bracebridge, Huntsville, Emsdale, Powassan, Callander, North Bay, Cobalt, Haileybury, New Liskeard and Thunder Bay. Beginning in the 1960s, the highway was four-laned between Barrie and North Bay in stages. Four laning was completed between Barrie and Gravenhurst in the 1960s, between Gravenhurst and Huntsville in the 1970s, and from North Bay south to Callandar in the 1980s. The remaining two lane section between Huntsville and Callander was four laned through the 1990s and 2000s, and was completed in 2012. A section concurrent with Highway17 east of Thunder Bay was rebuilt as a divided highway in the early 2010s and work continues. The two-lane Nipigon River Bridge was replaced with a twin-span bridge that opened in 2018, following a structural failure in 2016.

Route description 
Highway11 varies between a divided four-lane urban freeway and a two-lane rural road. It travels through surroundings ranging from cities to farmland, to the uninhabited wilderness. Significant urban centres serviced by the route include Barrie, Orillia, Gravenhurst, Bracebridge, Huntsville, North Bay, Temiskaming Shores, Cochrane, Kapuskasing, Hearst, Nipigon, Thunder Bay, Atikokan, Fort Frances and Rainy River.
It is often paired with Yonge Street in the persistent but incorrect factoid that Yonge Street is the longest street in the world, a claim that was featured in the book of Guinness World Records from 1977 to 1998.

Barrie – North Bay 
Highway11 begins at an interchange with Highway400 on the north side of Barrie, travelling northeast parallel to the northwestern shore of Lake Simcoe. The four-lane route, divided by a median barrier, crosses former Highway93 (Penetanguishene Road) and passes through a generally flat rural area, though businesses line both sides of the route. At the northern end of Lake Simcoe, the highway enters Orillia, where it is built as a divided freeway. At Laclie Drive, the route exits Orillia and returns to a RIRO design with rural surroundings. It travels northward along the western shore of Lake Couchiching as far as Washago, then crosses the Severn River / Trent Severn Waterway.

North of the Severn River, Highway11 travels through the Canadian Shield; large granite outcroppings are frequent and thick Boreal forest dominates the terrain. At Gravenhurst, the highway makes a sharp curve to the east then becomes a divided freeway before curving northward around Gull Lake. Near Bracebridge, it meets Highway 118 and former Highway 117. Highway 141 branches west from the route between Bracebridge and Huntsville, while Highway 60 branches east towards Algonquin Park in Huntsville. The section between Gravenhurst and Bracebridge is at freeway standards, while several at-grade intersections remain between Bracebridge and Huntsville.

The  section of Highway11 between Huntsville and North Bay provides access to the western side of Algonquin Park. It also connects to Highway 518 at Emsdale, Highway 520 at Burk's Falls, Highway 124 at Sundridge and South River, Highway 522 at Trout Creek, Highway 534 at Powassan, and Highway 94 and Highway 654 at Callander. Most of this section is built to freeway standards, although a small number of at-grade intersections remain, primarily between Trout Creek and Callander.

North Bay – Nipigon 

Marie while Highway11 turns north onto Algonquin Avenue. Due to a steep incline as it descends Thibeault Hill into North Bay, the southbound Algonquin Avenue segment of Highway11 features the only runaway truck ramp on Ontario's highway system, which was upgraded in 2009.
From Cochrane, it passes through communities such as Smooth Rock Falls, Kapuskasing, Hearst and Greenstone, arching across northeastern Ontario westward then south for  before again meeting Highway17 at Nipigon.

Nipigon – Rainy River 
Nearly the entire route from Nipigon to Rainy River is a two-lane, undivided road, with the exception of two twinned, four-lane segments approaching Thunder Bay. Work is being done to twin the route from Ouimet to Dorion. Additionally, the section from Balsam Street to the Harbour Expressway is four lanes wide, but undivided. The partial cloverleaf interchange at Thunder Bay's Hodder Avenue is the only interchange in Northwestern Ontario.

The highway then runs in a northwestern direction to Shabaqua Corners, where the two highways split; Highway17 continues northwest to Dryden and Kenora, while Highway11 continues in a generally west direction, eventually reaching Highway11B at Atikokan, approximately halfway between Thunder Bay and Rainy River. From here Highway11 shares a concurrency with Highway71 for  until the latter branches north after Emo, while Highway11 runs parallel to the border for  before ending at the town of Rainy River, where the roadway continues into Baudette, Minnesota, and ends at Minnesota State Route11.

Business routes 

Highway 11B is the designation for business routes of Highway11, ten of which have existed over the years. Two continue to exist today, while the remaining eight have been decommissioned. With the exception of the short spur route into Atikokan, all were once the route of Highway11 prior to the completion of a bypass alignment. All sections of Highway11B have now been decommissioned by the province with the exception of the Atikokan route and the southernmost section of the former Tri-Town route between Cobalt and Highway11.

 Highway 11B (Holland Landing)
 Highway 11B (Orillia)
 Highway 11B (Gravenhurst)
 Highway 11B (Huntsville)
 Highway 11B (Powassan)
 Highway 11B (North Bay)
 Highway 11B (Cobalt–Temiskaming Shores)
 Highway 11B (Matheson–Porquis Junction)
 Highway 11B (Thunder Bay)
 Highway 11B (Atikokan)

History

Predecessors 

The earliest established section of Highway11 is Yonge Street in Toronto and York Region, though it is no longer under provincial jurisdiction. Yonge Street was built under the order of the first Lieutenant-Governor of Upper Canada (now Ontario), John Graves Simcoe. Fearing imminent attack by the United States, he sought to create a military route between York (now Toronto) and Lake Simcoe. In doing so, he would create an alternative means of reaching the upper Great Lakes and the trading post at Michilimackinac, bypassing the American border.

In late 1793, Simcoe determined the route of his new road. The following spring, he instructed Deputy Surveyor General Augustus Jones to blaze a small trail marking the route.
Simcoe initiated construction of the road by granting land to settlers, who in exchange were required to clear  of frontage on the road passing their lot.
In the summer of 1794, William Berczy was the first to take up the offer, leading a group of 64 families north-east of Toronto to found the town of German Mills, in today's Markham. By the end of 1794, Berczy's settlers had cleared the route around Thornhill. However, the settlement was hit by a series of setbacks and road construction stalled.

Work on the road resumed in 1795 when the Queen's Rangers took over. They began their work at Eglinton Avenue and proceeded north, reaching the site of St. Albans on February16, 1796. Expansion of the trail into a road was a condition of settlement for farmers along the route, who were required to spend 12days a year to clear the road of logs, subsequently removed by convicted drunks as part of their sentence. The southern end of the road was in use in the first decade of the 19th century, and became passable all the way to the northern end in 1816.

For several years the Holland River and Lake Simcoe provided the only means of transportation; Holland Landing was the northern terminus of Yonge Street. The military route to Georgian Bay prior to, and during the War of 1812, crossed Lake Simcoe to the head of Kempenfelt Bay, then by the Nine Mile Portage to Willow Creek and the Nottawasaga River. The Penetanguishene Military Post was started before the war. However, lacking a suitable overland transport route, passage from York to Lake Huron continued via the Nottawasaga. The Penetanguishene Road, begun in 1814, replaced this route by the time the military post was opened in 1817.

In 1824, work began to extend Yonge Street to Kempenfelt Bay near Barrie. A north-western extension was branched off the original Yonge Street in Holland Landing and ran into the new settlement of Bradford before turning north towards Barrie. Work was completed by 1827, making connections with the Penetanguishene Road. A network of colonization roads built in the 1830s (some with military strategy in mind) pushed settlement northeast along the shores of Lake Simcoe and north towards the shores of Georgian Bay.
Construction of the Muskoka Road began by the 1860s. The road, which penetrated the southern skirts of the Canadian Shield and advanced towards Lake Nipissing, reached as far as Bracebridge by 1861, and to Huntsville by 1863.
It was officially opened when it reached Lake Nipissing in 1874.
Further extensions into Northern Ontario would await the arrival of the automobile, and consequent need for highway networks.

Assumption and paving 
Highway 11 was initially planned as a trunk road to connect the communities of Southern Ontario to those of Northern Ontario, as a continuous route from Toronto to North Bay. In 1919, Premier of Ontario Ernest Charles Drury created the Department of Public Highways (DPHO), though much of the responsibility for establishing the route he left to minister of the new cabinet position, Frank Campbell Biggs. By linking together several previously built roads such as Yonge Street, Penetanguishene Road, Middle Crossroad and the Muskoka Road—all early colonization roads in the region—a continuous route was created between Toronto and North Bay; however, the new department's jurisdiction did not extend north of the Severn River. Roads north of that point were maintained by the Department of Northern Development (DND).

In order to be eligible for federal funding, the DPHO established a network of provincial highways on February26, 1920. What would become Highway11 was routed along Yonge Street, its extension to the Penetanguishene Road, and the Muskoka Road as far as the Severn River.
The portions of Yonge Street through what is now York Region, as well as Toronto as far south as Yonge Boulevard, were assumed by the DPHO on June24, 1920, while the portions through Simcoe County, from Bradford to Severn Bridge were assumed two months later on August18.
It received its numerical designation in the summer of 1925.

The new route was mostly unpaved, with work beginning in 1922 to improve the roadway. That year saw paving completed between Yonge Boulevard and Thornhill, as well as a bypass of the original route through Holland Landing (now known as York Regional Road83).
The pavement was extended farther north from Thornhill to Richmond Hill the following year.
By 1925, the route was paved from Toronto north to Fennell, as well as between Orillia and Washago.
That year also saw paving completed from Washago to north of Gravenhurst.
The following year, the newly-renamed Department of Highways (DHO) paved the remaining 13kilometres between Barrie and Guthrie,
while the DND paved the Muskoka Road from Gravenhurst to Huntsville.
The final  of unpaved road between Barrie and Orillia was completed in 1931.

Ferguson Highway and extension to Nipigon 

Throughout the 1910s and early 1920s, various chambers of commerce, rotary clubs and boards of trade petitioned the government to construct a new trunk road from North Bay towards the mining communities to the north that were established in the prior decades.
These delegations and committees also saw the potential tourist draw of opening the Temagami area to hunters, fishers, and recreational tourism.
By 1923, a road existed between Cobalt and Kirkland Lake, as well as between Ramore and Cochrane, with an approximately  gap separating the two sections.
Conservative leader Howard Ferguson promised to build a road to connect North Bay and Cochrane during the 1923 Ontario general election, which saw him elected as premier.

The route of the new road between North Bay and Cobalt was cleared by April 1925,
after which construction began in August from both North Bay as well as Cobalt.
The new gravel highway was officially opened on July2, 1927, by Minister of Lands and Forests William Finlayson. He suggested at the opening that the road be named the Ferguson Highway in honour of premier Ferguson. The name was originally suggested by North Bay mayor Dan Barker.
Despite the official opening, a section between Swastika and Ramore wasn't opened until August.
The Ferguson Highway name was also applied to the Muskoka Road between Severn Bridge and North Bay.
Although the route from North Bay to Cochrane was passable, it was not an adequate road in many places. Construction continued for several years to build bypasses of sharp turns, steep grades, awkward rail crossings, and other obstacles. The Ferguson Highway was extended from Cochrane to Kapuskasing by 1930, and later to Hearst in 1932.

Consequently, the DHO assumed responsibility of roads north of the Trent–Severn Waterway over the next several months. On June2,  of the Ferguson Highway was assumed by the DHO through Cochrane District. This was followed one week later when  of the Muskoka Road through the District of Muskoka were assumed on June9. A  portion of the route, which included a portion of what is now Highway 94 to connect to the Dionne quintuplets, was assumed through Parry Sound District on June16. On June30,  of the Ferguson Highway were assumed north of North Bay within Nipissing District, as well as  through Timiskaming District.

Construction began in 1938 on a road to connect Highway17 at Nipigon with the gold mines discovered near the town of Geraldton several years earlier.
Although portions of this new road were passable by the end of 1939,
the Nipigon–Geraldton Highway was opened ceremoniously by Thomas McQuesten and C. D. Howe on September7, 1940;
it was assumed as a provincial highway in 1941.
With the onset of World War II, the need for an east–west connection across Canada became imperative,
Due to the shortage of labour, several prison camps were established between the two communities in October of that year and work began to clear a tote road for the movement of supplies over the following winter.
While the highway was completed in November 1942, it was not maintained during through the winter, and the official opening did not take place until June12, 1943.

Thunder Bay – Rainy River 

Highway11 ended at Nipigon until the late 1950s, after construction of a new highway west from Thunder Bay towards Fort Frances began. 
During World War II, large deposits of iron ore were discovered at Steep Rock Lake, around which the town of Atikokan was developed.
The need to connect the burgeoning community to the road network became apparent following a rail strike in August 1950, during which a "mercy train" was delivered to the isolated town. Throughout the fall of 1950, various delegates pressed the provincial government to construct a road link immediately.
The province announced plans for the new highway between Atikokan and Shebandowan the following August,
and released the proposed route on October10; construction began shortly thereafter.
The Atikokan Highway was ceremonially opened by premier Leslie Frost on August13, 1954, although traffic had used the incomplete road beginning in November 1953. At that event, which saw him use an axe to cut a ribbon, Frost announced the future vision to extend the new route to Fort Frances. Despite the opening, work was ongoing to improve the existing road between the end of the new highway at Shebandowan and Highway17 at Shabaqua Corners.

Initially this road was designated as Highway120. In 1959, it was decided to make this new link a westward extension of Highway11. On April1, 1960, Highway11 assumed the route of Highway120; this consequently created a concurrency of Highway11 and 17 between Nipigon and west of Thunder Bay.
Now reaching as far as Atikokan, construction of a road between there and Fort Frances was carried out over the next five years. The final link, the  Noden Causeway over Rainy Lake, was opened on June28, 1965, after which Highway11 was extended to Rainy River and the American border.

Lakehead Expressway 

In 1963, Charles MacNaughton, minister of the Department of Highways, announced plans for the Lakehead Expressway to be built on the western edge of the twin cities of Port Arthur and Fort William (which amalgamated in 1970 to form Thunder Bay).
Work began in August 1965, with a contract for a  section of divided highway on the west side of the twin cities.
The first section of the expressway opened on August29, 1967, connecting Oliver Road (then part of Highway 130) and Golf Links Road with Dawson Road (Highway 102).
By mid- to late 1969, the route had been extended to Highway 527 northeast of the twin cities and to Highway11 and Highway17 (Arthur Street) at the Harbour Expressway.
By late 1970, the route had been extended southward from Arthur Street to Neebing Avenue / Walsh Street West. At this time, Highway11 and 17 and Highway61 were rerouted along the completed expressway. The old routes through Thunder Bay were redesignated as Highway 11B/17B and Highway 61B.

Expansion and rerouting 

While Highway11 was extended farther north and west between the 1920s and 1960s, numerous projects took place along the sections between Barrie and Cochrane during that period to either realign the highway to improve the geometry, or to bypass built up areas. The largest bottleneck along the highway in the 1940s was between Washago and through Gravenhurst, where construction began in 1947 to realign  between the two towns, including a new high-level bridge over the Trent–Severn Waterway.
The original bypass of Gravenhurst, along what is now Bethune Drive, opened in 1948,
while reconstruction of the remainder of the route between Washago and Gravenhurst was completed in 1949.

To the south, improvements between Barrie and Orillia, including a divided four-lane highway around the latter, were completed by 1955.
During that period, a two-lane bypass around Washago was built between 1954 and 1955.
Similar bypasses were built between Barrie and North Bay over the next decade, which were later incorporated into the modern four-lane route. A bypass of Bracebridge opened July1, 1953.
The North Bay bypass was completed in 1953,
while bypasses of Emsdale and Powassan were completed 1956
and 1957, respectively. Construction of the Huntsville Bypass began in 1957;
it opened November27, 1959.
The original Callander Bypass, which is now divided into Callander Bay Drive and part of Highway 93, also opened in October 1959.
Further north, the  Tri-Town Bypass, from Gillies to north of New Liskeard, was opened on September18. The new route bypassed the towns of Cobalt, Haileybury and New Liskeard (the latter two which have since become part of Temiskaming Shores).
In several cases, the original route of Highway11 became a business route (Highway11B, see #Business routes) upon the completion of a bypass.

Beginning in 1965
Highway11 was widened to a divided four-lane route between Orillia and North Bay. Initially, this work began at the southern end and progressed northwards; work later began southwards from North Bay.
Construction continued north of Severn River, with a  section—including a second bridge over the Severn River—opening as far north as Kahshe Lake in October 1966. Construction on the next  from Kahshe Lake to south of Gravenhurst began that year.
The current  bypass of Gravenhurst, crossing Gull Lake, was announced on March31, 1966,
and construction began in the spring of 1967.
The new bypass was completed and opened in late 1970.

By 1971, Highway11 was a four lane divided highway from Orillia to the northern interchange with Bethune Drive in Gravenhurst, and work was underway on twinning the highway between Gravenhurst and then-Highway 117 (now Highway 118), north of Bracebridge;
That project was completed by 1974.

Downloading and four-laning Huntsville to Powassan 

In 1996 and 1997, the care (or rescinding of Connecting Link agreements) of Highway11 from Barrie southwards, including all of Yonge Street, was transferred by the provincial government to county, regional, and city governments by the Ministry of Transportation of Ontario as part of the Mike Harris government's Common Sense Revolution. This practice is called downloading, in that the financial burden will fall to a lower tier government. The entire  of Highway11 within York Region was transferred to the region on April1, 1996.
Along with the name Yonge Street, the section in York Region is now York Regional Road1, while the section in Simcoe County is now mostly Simcoe County Road4. Within the city of Toronto, which does not have a road numbering system, it is known as Yonge Street.

where an interchange was built in 1992,
as well as from North Bay south to Powassan.
A continuous construction project was carried out over the next 15years to widen the remaining  between Huntsville and Powassan.
A  project to twin the existing two lane highway between Powassan and McGillvray Creek opened in September 1997. This was followed in October 1999 with the opening of another  of twinning from McGillvray Creek south to Hummel Line, north of Trout Creek.

In the early 2000s, several more sections were completed at both the north and south end of the remaining two lane highway. A  section was opened in September 2001 north of the Huntsville Bypass to south of Novar, mostly along a new alignment alongside the existing highway. On October3, 2002, the southbound lanes of the  Trout Creek Bypass, a new alignment around that town, were opened, followed by the northbound lanes two weeks later. An additional  of twinning was completed by the end of that year between Novar and south of Emsdale.

In 2003, a major failure of the Sgt. Aubrey Cosens VC Memorial Bridge at the Montreal River in Latchford caused a complete closure and significant detour.
A temporary one-lane Bailey bridge, which opened two weeks after the incident, was constructed to carry traffic on the highway;
due to the expected water levels on the Montreal River once ice and snow began to melt in the spring, however, a second temporary bridge then had to be constructed for the duration of the original bridge's reconstruction. 
According to the Ministry of Transportation's final report, the failure was caused by a fatigue fracture of three steel hanger rods on the northwest side of the bridge.
Following reconstruction, the bridge resumed service in 2005. Each hanger rod was replaced with four cable wires, to provide greater stability in the event of a wire failure.

On October30, 2004, another  of four-laning was opened between the south end of the Trout Creek Bypass and north of South River.
To the south, a  bypass of Emsdale opened the week of October21, 2005, with a portion of the original Emsdale Bypass (constructed in 1956) remaining as Highway 518.
A  section from south of Burk's Falls to south of Katrine was four-laned by late 2010, mostly along a new alignment. The  Sundridge–South River Bypass opened to traffic on or about September20, 2011, along a new alignment.
The final two projects, twinning the Burk's Falls Bypass and a new alignment alongside the existing highway between Burk's Falls and Sundridge, were completed and opened together on August8, 2012, completing the four laning between Barrie and North Bay. Overall, the project between Huntsville and Powassan required "16new interchanges, 54new bridges, 1.7million cubic meters of rock excavation, 10.5million cubic metres of earth excavation, 4.6million tonnes of granular material applied and 500,000tonnes of asphalt."

Since 2010 

Plans for four-laning Highway11/17 from the end of the Thunder Bay Expressway northwest to Nipigon, including the Nipigon River Bridge, were first announced in December 1989.
The corridor was divided into four segments, and an Environmental Study Report (ESR) was published for each in 1996 or 1997.
While the MTO designated the corridor—a mix of twinning the existing highway and a new alignment—in 2003, funding wasn't committed to the project until the late 2000s. In early-to-mid 2009, the provincial government announced the first of several contracts to expand the highway, starting from the Thunder Bay end.
The westbound lanes opened the weekend of August 6, 2011;
the existing highway was then rebuilt as the eastbound lanes, and opened on August 17, 2012. An interchange at Hodder Avenue—the first in Northwestern Ontario—was included as part of this project

By 2012, construction was already underway on two more contracts: A $46-million project to twin  of the existing highway between Highway527 and west of Mackenzie Station Road that began in 2010,
and another 12.3-kilometre project built along a new alignment east of that point to Birch Beach Road. The latter project was completed first, opening in July 2013,
while the former was opened the week of September 29, 2014.

Construction began in 2013 on a new four lane cable-stayed bridge across the Nipigon River, to replace the existing two lane bridge built in 1974.
The southern span to carry the future westbound lanes was opened on November28, 2015, after which the old bridge closed. It was subsequently demolished to allow the construction of the northern span to carry eastbound traffic, which was scheduled for 2017.
However, on January10, 2016, the bridge experienced a significant structural failure in which the deck raised , severing the only highway connection between eastern and western Canada.
A single lane was reopened the following day and repairs began; both lanes were reopened on February25, 2016.
The failure caused a significant delay in the construction of the northern span, which did not open until November23, 2018,
The  of approaches at each end were completed in 2019.

On June 10, 2015, the province announced the awarding of two contracts: A $32.7 million contract awarded to twin  of the existing highway from Birch Beach Road to Highway 587 near Loon, and an $84.8 million contract to construct a new  alignment from Red Rock Road No. 9 to Stillwater Creek near Nipigon.
Construction began on the former in October,
and on the latter by the end of June. The section from Birch Beach Road to Highway587 was completed on September 1, 2017,
while the section from Red Rock Road No. 9 to Stillwater Creek was completed in September 2019.

On March 29, 2022, the Government of Ontario announced that it was extending it's  speed limit increase, on a trial basis, to the section of Highway11 from north of Katrine to north of South River.

Future 
Work is ongoing or upcoming to twin or realign the remaining  of two-laned Highway11/17 between Thunder Bay and Nipigon. Construction started a few weeks earlier at the end of November. The project is scheduled for completion in September 2023.
On July11, 2022,  of the new eastbound lanes opened from Ouimet Canyon Road to Superior Shores Road. The remainder of the eastbound lanes, from Ouimet Canyon Road to Dorion Loop Road, are scheduled to open by the end of the year.

On April9, 2022, the province announced a $107-million contract to twin and realign  of Highway11/17 from the end of the existing four lane route near Highway 587 to Pearl. Construction is scheduled to begin in late 2022 and be completed in 2026.

The remaining 
are in the detailed design process as of 2022, and are broken up into several sections:  between Pearl and south of Ouimet;  between Dorion Loop Road and near Highway 582;  between Highway582 and Coughlin Road;  between Coughlin Road and Red Rock Road No. 9, crossing the Black Sturgeon River and connecting with the existing four lane route, and;  through Nipigon, between Stillwater Creek and First Street.

Highway11 between Barrie and Gravenhurst is currently a right-in/right-out (RIRO) expressway (local access permitted, turnarounds via special interchanges), except for a section around Orillia which is a full freeway. Another freeway section (formerly Highway400A) does exist in Barrie with the freeway segment from the southern terminus ending at Penetanguishene Road (Simcoe County Road93). The MTO is currently planning on either converting the existing RIRO expressway to a full six-lane freeway or bypassing it with an entirely new alignment.  An environmental and fiscal study concluded that the improvements from Barrie to Gravenhurst will involve the existing route being widened with the exception of a portion south of Gravenhurst that may potentially be constructed to the east of the current road.

Major intersections

Images

See also
Webers, a fast-food restaurant located alongside the highway, near Orillia

References

Sources

Bibliography

External links 

Ontario Plaques – Ferguson Highway
Ontario Highway 11 Homepage – A Virtual Community-by-Community Trip Along the World's Longest Street
Highway 11 @ AsphaltPlanet.ca
Four-laning studies Thunder Bay–Nipigon
Highway 11/17 Four-Laning (Pearl), Municipality of Shuniah
Highway 11/17 Four-Laning: From Pearl Lake, easterly to 2.8 km west of CPR Overhead at Ouimet, 7.6km
Highway 11/17 Four-Laning from Ouimet to Dorion
Highway 11/17 Four-Laning: From east of Junction Highway 582 westerly to Dorion, 11 km
Highway 11/17 Expansion from west of Highway 582 to Coughlin Road
Highway 11/17 Expansion from Coughlin Road to Red Rock Road #9

011
Ontario 011
Roads in Thunder Bay
Transport in Barrie
Transport in Bracebridge, Ontario
Transport in Fort Frances
Transport in Huntsville, Ontario
Transport in North Bay, Ontario
Transport in Orillia
Transport in Temagami